Michael Saward (born 1 September 1960), is an Australian and British professor of politics and international studies at the University of Warwick, He was formerly Reader in Politics at Royal Holloway, University of London, and Professor and Head of Department in politics and international studies at the Open University.

He was a Leverhulme Major Research Fellow, 2016–19, is a member of the Sydney Democracy Network and was Director of the Midlands Graduate School, 2013-16.

Education 
Michael Saward gained his doctorate from the University of Essex in 1989.

Research 
His research focuses on the way key political ideas change over time, and how they are worked out in practice. Contemporary ideas of democracy is also a subject which he has written about extensively.

Career 
Before joining as a reader in 2000 Open University, Saward worked at the Royal Holloway, University of London.

In 2006 the Open University made him director of the Citizenship Strand in the Centre for Citizenship, Identities and Governance (CCIG). His inaugural speech, on the theme of what it means to 'do' political representation theory, took place on 4 July 2006 at the Berrill Lecture Theatre, at the Open University.

Bibliography

Books

Book chapters

Journal articles 
1990 – 1999
 
 
 
 
 
 

2000 – 2009
 
 
  
  Pdf.
 
 
 
 
 
 
 
 
 
 
 

2010 onwards
 
 
  Pdf.

See also 
 Democracy
 Representation (politics)
 Representative democracy
 Political philosophy

References

External links 
 Representation (journal) Editorial board (Michael Saward)
 Profile University of Warwick
 Profile Sydney Democracy Network

1960 births
Living people
Alumni of the University of Essex
Academics of Royal Holloway, University of London
Academics of the Open University
Academics of the University of Warwick
Australian political philosophers